Merl Grove High School is a high school in Kingston, Jamaica.

External links

High schools in Jamaica
Schools in Kingston, Jamaica
Educational institutions established in 1920
1920 establishments in Jamaica